Liscate is a comune (municipality) in the Province of Milan in the Italian region Lombardy, located about  east of Milan.

References

External links
 Official website

Cities and towns in Lombardy